Jacobus Demarest House is located in New Milford, Bergen County, New Jersey, United States. The house was built in 1765 and was added to the National Register of Historic Places on February 17, 1978.

The historical marker at the property states:

The earliest part of this house, one of the oldest in the county, was built on land purchased in 1677 by David Demarest Sr., founder of the Huguenot Colony in Bergen County. His grandson Jacobus, born 1681, lived here until his death in 1763. Jacobus’ son John completed the house in 1765. It remained in the family until 1850. An architectural feature surviving from its early days is its unbroken gambrel roof.

See also
National Register of Historic Places listings in Bergen County, New Jersey
List of the oldest buildings in New Jersey

References

Houses on the National Register of Historic Places in New Jersey
Houses completed in 1765
Houses in Bergen County, New Jersey
National Register of Historic Places in Bergen County, New Jersey
New Milford, New Jersey
New Jersey Register of Historic Places
1765 establishments in New Jersey